The 2007 World Junior Wrestling Championships were the 31st edition of the World Junior Wrestling Championships and were held in Beijing, China between 20 and 26 August 2007.

Medal table

Medal summary

Men's freestyle

Greco-Roman

Women's freestyle

References

External links 
 UWW Database

World Junior Championships
Wrestling Championships
International wrestling competitions hosted by China
Wrestling in China
World Junior Wrestling Championships
Sports competitions in Beijing